Markoski is a surname. Notable people with the surname include:

 Aleksandar Markoski (born 1975), Serbian former footballer
 Bojan Markoski (born 1983), Macedonian footballer
 Jovan Markoski (born 1980), Serbian footballer
 Kire Markoski (born 1995), Macedonian footballer
 Nikola Markoski (born 1990), Macedonian handball player
 Velko Markoski (born 1986), Macedonian handball player

See Also 
 Markovski
 Markowski